A chemical nomenclature is a set of rules to generate  systematic names for chemical compounds. The nomenclature used most frequently worldwide is the one created and developed by the International Union of Pure and Applied Chemistry (IUPAC).

The IUPAC's rules for naming organic and inorganic compounds are contained in two publications, known as the Blue Book and the Red Book, respectively. A third publication, known as the Green Book, recommends the use of symbols for physical quantities (in association with the IUPAP), while a fourth, the Gold Book, defines many technical terms used in chemistry. Similar compendia exist for biochemistry (the White Book, in association with the IUBMB), analytical chemistry (the Orange Book), macromolecular chemistry (the Purple Book), and clinical chemistry (the Silver Book). These "color books" are supplemented by specific recommendations published periodically in the journal Pure and Applied Chemistry.

Aims of chemical nomenclature 
The main goal of chemical nomenclature is to disambiguate the spoken or written names of chemical compounds: each name should refer to one compound. Secondarily: each compound should have only one name, although in some cases some alternative names are accepted.

Preferably, the name should also reflect the structure or chemistry of a compound. This is achieved by the International Chemical Identifier (InChI) nomenclature. However, the American Chemical Society's CAS numbers nomenclature reflects nothing of the compound's structure.

The nomenclature used depends on the needs of the user, so no single correct nomenclature exists. Rather, different nomenclatures suit different circumstances.

A common name will successfully identify a chemical compound, given context. Without context, the name should indicate at least the chemical composition. To be more specific, the name may need to reflect the three-dimensional arrangement of the atoms.This requires adding more rules to the standard IUPAC system (the CAS system is the most commonly used in this context), at the expense of having longer and less familiar names. 

The IUPAC system is often criticized for the failing to distinguish relevant compounds (for example, in differing reactivity of sulfur allotropes, which IUPAC does not distinguish). While IUPAC has a human-readable advantage over CAS numbering, IUPAC names for some larger, relevant molecules (such as rapamycin) are barely human-readable, so common names are used instead.

Differing aims of chemical nomenclature and lexicography 
It is generally understood that the aims of lexicography versus chemical nomenclature vary and are to an extent at odds. Dictionaries of words, whether in traditional print or on the web, collect and report the meanings of words as their uses appear and change over time. For web dictionaries with limited or no formal editorial process, definitions —in this case, definitions of chemical names and terms— can change rapidly without concern for the formal or historical meanings. Chemical nomenclature on the other hand (with IUPAC nomenclature as the best example) is necessarily more restrictive: It aims to standardize communication and practice so that, when a chemical term is used it has a fixed meaning relating to chemical structure, thereby giving insights into chemical properties and derived molecular functions. These differing aims can have profound effects on valid understanding in chemistry, especially with regard to chemical classes that have achieved mass attention. Examples of the impact of these can be seen in considering the examples of:
 resveratrol, a single compound clearly defined by this common name, but that can be confused, popularly, with its cis-isomer,
 omega-3 fatty acids, a reasonably well-defined chemical structure class that is nevertheless broad as a result of its formal definition, and
 polyphenols, a fairly broad structural class with a formal definition, but where mistranslations and general misuse of the term relative to the formal definition has led to serious usage errors, and so ambiguity in the relationship between structure and activity (SAR).
The rapid pace at which meanings can change on the web, in particular for chemical compounds with perceived health benefits, rightly or wrongly ascribed, complicate the monosemy of nomenclature (and so access to SAR understanding). Specific examples appear on the polyphenols article, where varying web and common-use definitions conflict with any accepted chemical nomenclature connecting polyphenol structure and bioactivity).

History 

The nomenclature of alchemy is rich in description, but does not effectively meet the aims outlined above. Opinions differ about whether this was deliberate on the part of the early practitioners of alchemy or whether it was a consequence of the particular (and often esoteric) theoretical framework in which they worked.

While both explanations are probably valid to some extent, it is remarkable that the first "modern" system of chemical nomenclature appeared at the same time as the distinction (by Lavoisier) between elements and compounds, in the late eighteenth century.

The French chemist Louis-Bernard Guyton de Morveau published his recommendations in 1782, hoping that his "constant method of denomination" would "help the intelligence and relieve the memory". The system was refined in collaboration with Berthollet, de Fourcroy and Lavoisier, and promoted by the latter in a textbook that would survive long after his death at the guillotine in 1794. The project was also espoused by Jöns Jakob Berzelius, who adapted the ideas for the German-speaking world.

The recommendations of Guyton covered only what would be today known as inorganic compounds. With the massive expansion of organic chemistry in the mid-nineteenth century and the greater understanding of the structure of organic compounds, the need for a less ad hoc system of nomenclature was felt just as the theoretical tools became available to make this possible. An international conference was convened in Geneva in 1892 by the national chemical societies, from which the first widely accepted proposals for standardization arose.

A commission was set up in 1913 by the Council of the International Association of Chemical Societies, but its work was interrupted by World War I. After the war, the task passed to the newly formed International Union of Pure and Applied Chemistry, which first appointed commissions for organic, inorganic, and biochemical nomenclature in 1921 and continues to do so to this day.

Types of nomenclature

Organic chemistry 

 Substitutive name
 Functional class name, also known as a radicofunctional name
 Conjunctive name
 Additive name
 Subtractive name
 Multiplicative name
 Fusion name
 Hantzsch–Widman name
 Replacement name

Inorganic chemistry

Compositional nomenclature

Type-I ionic binary compounds 
For type-I ionic binary compounds, the cation (a metal in most cases) is named first, and the anion (usually a nonmetal) is named second. The cation retains its elemental name (e.g., iron or zinc), but the suffix of the nonmetal changes to -ide. For example, the compound  is made of  cations and  anions; thus, it's called lithium bromide. The compound , which is composed of  cations and  anions, is referred to as barium oxide.

The oxidation state of each element is unambiguous. When these ions combine into a type-I binary compound, their equal-but-opposite charges are neutralized, so the compound's net charge is zero.

Type-II ionic binary compounds 
Type-II ionic binary compounds are those in which the cation does not have just one oxidation state. This is common among transition metals. To name these compounds, one must determine the charge of the cation and then write out the name as would be done with Type-I ionic compounds, except that a Roman numeral (indicating the charge of the cation) is written in parentheses next to the cation name (this is sometimes referred to as Stock nomenclature). For example, take the compound . In order for the compound to have a net charge of zero, the cation must be  so that the three  anions can be balanced out (3+ and 3− balance to 0). Thus, this compound is called iron(III) chloride. Another example could be the compound . Because the  anion has a subscript of 2 in the formula (giving a 4− charge), the compound must be balanced with a 4+ charge on the  cation (lead can form cations with a 4+ or a 2+ charge). Thus, the compound is made of one  cation to every two  anions, the compound is balanced, and its name is written as lead(IV) sulfide. 

An older system – relying on Latin names for the elements – is also sometimes used to name Type-II ionic binary compounds. In this system, the metal (instead of a Roman numeral next to it) has an "-ic" or "-ous" suffix added to it to indicate its oxidation state ("-ous" for lower, "-ic" for higher). For example, the compound  contains the  cation (which balances out with the  anion). Since this oxidation state is lower than the other possibility, this compound is sometimes called ferrous oxide.

Some ionic compounds contain polyatomic ions, which are charged entities containing two or more covalently bonded types of atoms. It is important to know the names of common polyatomic ions; these include:
 ammonium
 nitrite
 nitrate
 sulfite
 sulfate
 hydrogen sulfate (bisulfate)
 hydroxide
 cyanide
 phosphate
 hydrogen phosphate
 dihydrogen phosphate
 carbonate
 hydrogen carbonate (bicarbonate)
 hypochlorite
 chlorite
 chlorate
 perchlorate
 acetate
 permanganate
 dichromate
 chromate
 peroxide
 superoxide
 oxalate
 hydrogen oxalate

Therefore, this compound is named sodium sulfite. Since the charge on the calcium ion is 2+, it makes sense there must be two  ions to balance the charge. Therefore, the name of the compound is calcium hydroxide.

Type-III binary compounds 
Type-III binary compounds are covalently bonded. Covalent bonding occurs between nonmetal elements. Covalently-bonded compounds are also known as molecules. In the compound, the first element is named first and with its full elemental name. The second element is named as if it were an anion (root name of the element + -ide suffix). Then, prefixes are used to indicate the numbers of each atom present: these prefixes are mono- (one), di- (two), tri- (three), tetra- (four), penta- (five), hexa- (six), hepta- (seven), octa- (eight), nona- (nine), and deca- (ten). The prefix mono- is never used with the first element. Thus,  is called nitrogen trichloride,  is called diphosphorus pentaoxide (the a of the penta- prefix is not dropped before the vowel.

Carbon dioxide is written ; sulfur tetrafluoride is written . A few compounds, however, have common names that prevail.

Substitutive nomenclature 
This naming method generally follows established IUPAC organic nomenclature. Hydrides of the main group elements (groups 13–17) are given -ane base name, e.g. borane, oxidane, phosphane (Although the name phosphine is also in common use, it is not recommended by IUPAC). The compound  would thus be named substitutively as trichlorophosphane (with chlorine "substituting"). However, not all such names (or stems) are derived from the element name. For example,  is called "azane".

Additive nomenclature 
This naming method has been developed principally for coordination compounds although it can be more widely applied.

Ligands, too, have a special naming convention. Whereas chloride becomes the prefix chloro- in substitutive naming, in a ligand it becomes chlorido-.

See also 
 IUPAC nomenclature of inorganic chemistry 2005
 IUPAC nomenclature of organic chemistry
 Preferred IUPAC name
 IUPAC numerical multiplier
 IUPAC nomenclature for organic transformations
 International Chemical Identifier
 List of chemical compounds with unusual names

References

External links 

 Interactive IUPAC Compendium of Chemical Terminology (interactive "Gold Book")
 IUPAC Nomenclature Books Series (list of all IUPAC nomenclature books, and means of accessing them)
 IUPAC Compendium of Chemical Terminology ("Gold Book")
 Quantities, Units and Symbols in Physical Chemistry ("Green Book")
 IUPAC Nomenclature of Organic Chemistry ("Blue Book")
 Nomenclature of Inorganic Chemistry IUPAC Recommendations 2005 ("Red Book")
 IUPAC Recommendations on Organic & Biochemical Nomenclature, Symbols, Terminology, etc. (includes IUBMB Recommendations for biochemistry)
 chemicalize.org A free web site/service that extracts IUPAC names from web pages and annotates a "chemicalized" version with structure images. Structures from annotated pages can also be searched.
 ChemAxon Name <> Structure – IUPAC (& traditional) name to structure and structure to IUPAC name software. As used at chemicalize.org
 ACD/Name – Generates IUPAC, INDEX (CAS), InChi, Smiles, etc. for drawn structures in 10 languages and translates names to structures. Also available as batch tool and for Pipeline Pilot. Part of  I-Lab 2.0